In January 2020, the municipality of Madrid, capital of Spain, had a population of 3,345,894 registered inhabitants in an area of . Thus, the city's population density was about 5,337 inhabitants per km². Madrid is Spain's largest city and the second most populous city proper in the European Union, after Berlin.

Historical change

The population of Madrid has overall increased since the city became the capital of Spain in the mid-16th century, and has stabilised at approximately 3 million since the 1970s.

From 1970 until the mid-1990s, the population dropped. This phenomenon, which also affected other European cities, was caused in part by the growth of satellite suburbs at the expense of the downtown region within the city proper. This also occurred during a period of slowed growth in the European economy.

The demographic boom accelerated in the late 1990s and early first decade of the 21st century due to immigration in parallel with a surge in Spanish economic growth. According to census data, the population of the city grew by 271,856 between 2001 and 2005.

The Community of Madrid is the EU region with the highest average life expectancy at birth. The average life expectancy was 82.2 years for males and 87.8 for females in 2016.

Immigration

As the capital city of Spain, the city has attracted many immigrants from around the world, with most of the immigrants coming from Latin American countries. In 2020, around 76% of the registered population was Spain-born, while, regarding the foreign-born population (24%), the bulk of it relates to the Americas (around 16% of the total population), and a lesser fraction of the population is born in other European, Asian and African countries.

As of 2019 the highest rising national group of immigrants was Venezuelans.

Religion
Most people in Madrid are Roman Catholic Christians. It is the seat of the Roman Catholic Archdiocese of Madrid. In a 2011 survey conducted by InfoCatólica, 63.3% of Madrid residents of all ages identified themselves as Catholic.

According to a 2019 Centro de Investigaciones Sociológicas (CIS) survey with a sample size of 469 respondents, 20.7% of respondents in Madrid identify themselves as practising Catholics, 45.8% as non-practising Catholics, 3.8% as believers of another religion, 11.1% as agnostics, 3.6% as indifferent towards religion, and 12.8% as atheists. The remaining 2.1% did not state their religious beliefs.

Metropolitan region

It is the largest metropolitan area in Spain and the third largest in the European Union.

References

Geography of Madrid
History of Madrid
Madrid